Simon Walsh is a British barrister specialising in police, licensing, and ecclesiastical law, a magistrate in the City of London, and an Alderman of the City of London for the ward of Farringdon Without.

Early life 
Walsh was educated at Manchester Grammar School, then studied modern languages at Balliol College, Oxford, graduating in 1984. He then studied law at City University, London, where he qualified as a lawyer in 1986. He was called to the bar in 1987 and became a magistrate in 2000.

Career
Walsh sits on the Central London Valuation Tribunal, which he chaired from 1992, and was chairman of the City of London Corporation police committee from 2002 to 2005, then deputy chairman. He also chaired the City of London Licensing Authority from 2007.

He was formerly an aide to the Mayor of London, Boris Johnson, who appointed him a member of the London Fire and Emergency Planning Authority, a position which he held until 31 October 2011.

As a barrister, he was a self-employed member of the 5 Essex Court chambers.

In August 2012, Walsh was charged with possessing five images of "extreme pornography", which were not found by police on his computers, but as email attachments on a Hotmail server account. He was found not guilty on all counts. Three images were of urethral sounding, and two of anal fisting. The images were all of consensual adult sexual activity. He was defended by Myles Jackman.

References

External links 
 Walsh's biography as a City of London alderman

English barristers
Aldermen of the City of London
Year of birth missing (living people)
Alumni of City, University of London
Alumni of Balliol College, Oxford
Living people
People educated at Manchester Grammar School
English LGBT politicians